Catasauqua Area School District is a school district spanning portions of two counties in the Lehigh Valley region of eastern Pennsylvania. In Lehigh County, it covers the boroughs of Catasauqua and Hanover Township.  In Northampton County, it covers the borough of North Catasauqua. 

The district operates Catasauqua High School in Northampton for grades nine through 12, Catasauqua Middle School in Catasauqua for grades five through eight, and Sheckler Elementary School in Catasauqua for kindergarten through fifth grade. As of the 2021–22 school year, the school district had a total enrollment of 1,480 students between all three of its schools, according to National Center for Education Statistics data.

Construction
In the early 2000s, Catasauqua built a new high school in Allen Township and remodeled the former high school, changing it into the Catasauqua Middle School. The old middle school, Lincoln Middle School, was purchased by Allentown developer Abraham Atiyeh at a cost of $900,000.

Athletic achievements
1997 Boys Baseball PIAA Class 2A State Champions
1988 Girls Basketball PIAA Class 2A State Champions
Back to back Colonial League Football championships
Back to back district 11 appearances
District 11 Football 2A Champions (2013)

Middle school achievements

Gifted Support Program
Took 1st place at 2006 PBS Digital Innovations Contest
Took 2nd place and 2007 PBS Digital Innovations Contest
Took 1st place at 2007 regional Pennsylvania Middle School Computer Fair (CLIU #21)

References

External links

Catasauqua Area School District on Facebook

School districts in Lehigh County, Pennsylvania
School districts in Northampton County, Pennsylvania